A Son from America (French: Un fils d'Amérique) is a 1932 French-Hungarian comedy drama film directed by Carmine Gallone and starring Albert Préjean, Annabella, and Gaston Dubosc. It was a co-production made at the Hunnia Film Studios in Budapest. The same story had previously been made into a 1924 silent film of the same name.

Cast
 Albert Préjean as Pierre Berterin  
 Annabella as Dorette  
 Gaston Dubosc as M. Berterin  
 Guy Sloux as Guy Dupont  
 Henri Kerny as Mouchin  
 Jane Loury as Mme. Mouchin  
 Simone Simon as Maryse

References

Bibliography 
 Jonathan Driskell. The French Screen Goddess: Film Stardom and the Modern Woman in 1930s France. I.B.Tauris, 2015.

External links 
 

1932 films
1932 comedy-drama films
French comedy-drama films
Hungarian comedy-drama films
1930s French-language films
Films directed by Carmine Gallone
Remakes of French films
Sound film remakes of silent films
French films based on plays
French black-and-white films
Hungarian black-and-white films
1930s French films